Diana Wang (born 14 November 1990) is a Dutch-born Taiwanese singer and film actress.

Early life and education 
Wang was born Chu Lan-ting (朱蘭亭) on 14 November 1990 in Gorinchem, the Netherlands, with ancestry from Shanghai.

Musical career 
Wang signed with Warner Records after competing in the 7th season of One Million Star. She released her debut album, How Are You Love Lesson on 23 August 2013.

Discography 

 How Are You Love Lesson? (2013)
 Poems (2017)

References

External links 

21st-century Taiwanese women singers
Dutch people of Chinese descent
Dutch women singers
People from Gorinchem
1990 births
Living people